Gerald Aste (30 July 1900 – 17 September 1961) was an English cricketer. He played eleven first-class matches for various teams in India between 1922 and 1936.

Career
Born in Beckenham, South London, England, Aste made his first-class debut in January 1922, playing for the Europeans in the annual Madras Presidency Match. He also played in the fixture in the following four years until 1926, a year in which he played for the Europeans in the Bombay Quadrangular for the first time. He played in the final of that tournament in 1927.

He played twice for the Straits Settlements against the Federated Malay States in 1929 and 1931, before returning to India to finish his first-class career. He played for Sind against the MCC in 1933, and in 1936 played for the Cricket Club of India against Australia and for Delhi in the Ranji Trophy.

References

1900 births
1961 deaths
Cricketers from Beckenham
Delhi cricketers
English cricketers
Europeans cricketers
Sindh cricketers
Straits Settlements cricketers
British people in colonial India
British people in British Malaya